Loxostege scutalis is a species of moth in the family Crambidae. It is found in France, Spain and Portugal.

References

Moths described in 1813
Pyraustinae
Moths of Europe